Bexley Hall was an Episcopal seminary that was created in association with Kenyon College in Gambier, Ohio, U.S.

Bexley Hall may also refer to:

 Bexley Hall Seabury Western Theological Seminary Federation (commonly known as Bexley Seabury), a seminary that was formed from the merger of Bexley Hall and Seabury-Western Theological Seminary 
 Bexley Hall (MIT), an undergraduate student residence at the Massachusetts Institute of Technology
 Hall Place, Bexley, London, a former stately home in Kent

See also
 Bexley (disambiguation)

Architectural disambiguation pages